Colonia Extremadura Insurgentes, or simply Extremadura Insurgentes, is a neighborhood located in southwest Mexico City, famous for being home to Parque Hundido.

Location

Colonia Extremadura Insurgentes is located in the Benito Juárez borough of Mexico City.

The neighborhood is bordered by:

Parque Hundido on the north, across which is Colonia Noche Buena
Augusto Rodin street on the west, across which is Colonia San Juan
Empresa street on the south, across which is Colonia Insurgentes Mixcoac
Avenida de los Insurgentes Sur, across which is Colonia Tlacoquemécatl

Description

Extremadura Insurgentes is a mainly residential neighborhood, relatively calm, despite bordering crowded Avenida de los Insurgentes Sur. The colonia has some small commerces such as restaurants, beauty parlors and grocery stores.

One of Mexico City's most important public parks, Parque Hundido is located in the area.

Transportation

Public transportation
The area is served by the Mexico City Metrobús and EcoBici bikeshare. Although not located inside the neighborhood limits, Insurgentes Sur metro station is within walking distance.

Metrobús stations
  Félix Cuevas.

References

Benito Juárez, Mexico City